Plaza de los hornos púnicos y fenicios is a plaza located in San Fernando in the Province of Cádiz, Andalusia, Spain.

References

Buildings and structures in San Fernando, Cádiz
Plazas in Spain